Castle Bloody is a prehistoric feature on the island of Shapinsay, Orkney, Scotland.  Hogan observes that while the feature is marked as a chambered mound on the UK Ordnance Survey map, the structure is more properly and specifically classified as a souterrain or earth house. Slightly to the north is located the ruined historic Linton Chapel.

It is protected as a scheduled monument.

See also

References

Shapinsay
Prehistoric Orkney
Archaeological sites in Orkney
Scheduled Ancient Monuments in Orkney